The Canton of Thuir is a former French canton of Pyrénées-Orientales department, in Languedoc-Roussillon. It had 22,262 inhabitants (2012). It was disbanded in 2015.

The canton comprised the following communes:

Brouilla
Caixas
Camélas
Castelnou
Fourques
Llauro
Llupia
Passa
Ponteilla
Saint-Jean-Lasseille
Sainte-Colombe-de-la-Commanderie
Terrats
Thuir
Tordères
Tresserre
Trouillas
Villemolaque

References

 	

Thuir